Hegetotherium is an extinct genus of mammals from the Early to Middle Miocene (Colhuehuapian-Colloncuran in the SALMA classification) of South America. Fossils of this genus have been found in the Cerro Bandera, Cerro Boleadoras, Chichinales, Collón Curá, Santa Cruz and Sarmiento Formations of Argentina, the Nazareno Formation of Bolivia, and the Galera and Río Frías Formations of Chile.

Taxonomy
Hegetotherium is currently restricted to the type species, H. mirable, of which H. convexum, H. anceps, H. minum and H. andinum are synonyms, but also H. cerdasensis. "Hegetotherium" arctum was formerly assigned to this genus, but is clearly not a member of Hegetotheriidae. "Hegetotherium" novum was formerly referred to the closely related genus Prohegetotherium, but is now considered generically distinct from that genus.

References 

Typotheres
Miocene mammals of South America
Colloncuran
Friasian
Santacrucian
Colhuehuapian
Neogene Argentina
Fossils of Argentina
Fossil taxa described in 1887
Taxa named by Florentino Ameghino
Prehistoric placental genera
Austral or Magallanes Basin
Golfo San Jorge Basin
Neuquén Basin
Santa Cruz Formation
Sarmiento Formation
Chichinales Formation
Cerro Bandera Formation